2011 Vegalta Sendai season.

Players

J Chronicle Best 
This is a project to select the J.League "Best Eleven", "Best Goal" and "Best Match" over the past 20 years. A project held in 2013 to commemorate the 20th anniversary of the Japan Professional Soccer League. The mentioned this game is often featured as a legendary game in each media. 

Even in "Soccer Digest" (Japan's famous football media),the two were selected as "the best 3 selected J.League matches" by the reporter in charge of Sendai. Sendai's Yoshiaki Ota, who scored the equalizing goal against Kawasaki, said, "I think it was a goal that everyone worked together, including the thoughts of my teammates."

Competitions

J. League

League table

Results summary

Results by round

J. League Cup

Emperor's Cup

Awards 

 Individual Fair-Play award
  Ryang Yong-gi
 Valuable Player Award
  Takuto Hayashi   Makoto Kakuda   Jiro Kamata

References

Vegalta Sendai
Vegalta Sendai seasons